Hirako (written: 平子) is a Japanese surname. Notable people with the surname include:

, Japanese speed skater
, Japanese model

See also
Hirako Station, a railway station in Shōbara, Hiroshima Prefecture, Japan

Japanese-language surnames